Nazih Geagea (born 16 October 1941) is a Lebanese alpine skier. He competed at the 1960 Winter Olympics and the 1964 Winter Olympics.

References

1941 births
Living people
Lebanese male alpine skiers
Olympic alpine skiers of Lebanon
Alpine skiers at the 1960 Winter Olympics
Alpine skiers at the 1964 Winter Olympics
People from Bsharri